Keith Williams (born December 12, 1983) is a former professional Canadian football cornerback. He was signed as an undrafted free agent by the Alouettes in 2007. He played college football for the Florida A&M Rattlers.

Williams also played for the Edmonton Eskimos and Montreal Alouettes.

External links
Montreal Alouettes bio

1983 births
Living people
American players of Canadian football
Canadian football defensive backs
Florida A&M Rattlers football players
Montreal Alouettes players
Edmonton Elks players
Sportspeople from Mount Vernon, New York